Kifisias Avenue is one of the longest and busiest avenues in the Greater Athens area, Greece, containing the headquarters of many Greek and foreign companies and organizations.

Description 
The total length of the Kifisias Avenue is about 20 km, beginning 4 km northeast of downtown Athens and ending by the municipal boundary of Nea Erythraia north of Kifisia. The number of lanes is three, up to Kifisia, then two through Kifissia, before it turns to a one lane (per direction) road for the rest of its length. The avenue begins at the intersection of Alexandras and Mesogeion Avenues, and then intersects with Katechaki Avenue, three roads to Neo Psychiko and Filothei as well as to the Athens Olympic Stadium. It also has a circular interchange with the Attiki Odos and other interchanges with roads to Vrilissia, Marousi and Tatoiou Avenue. The avenue passes near a forest park in Marousi, called Anavryta. The avenue has a bus lane for a significant section of its length, close to its start.

Together with Kallirois Avenue, Andrea Syngrou Avenue, Vasileos Konstantinou Avenue and Vasilissis Sofias Avenue, it forms a north to south corridor for the Greater Athens area. It is a significant commercial street and office space is in considerable demand with many key Greek companies based there. Along Kifisias Avenue, and more specifically in Psychico area many embassies and consulates are located including that of Albania, Israel, Cameroon, Kuwait, New Zealand, South Africa, South Korean, Ukraine, Palestine, North Macedonia, Saudi Arabia, Singapore, Thailand and Tunisia.

Places
Downtown Athens
Psychiko
Neo Psychiko
Filothei
Marousi
Kifisia

References

Streets in Athens
Transport in Athens